Marcel may refer to:

People
 Marcel (given name), people with the given name Marcel
 Marcel (footballer, born August 1981), Marcel Silva Andrade, Brazilian midfielder
 Marcel (footballer, born November 1981), Marcel Augusto Ortolan, Brazilian striker
 Marcel (footballer, born 1983), Marcel Silva Cardoso, Brazilian left back
 Marcel (footballer, born 1992), Marcel Henrique Garcia Alves Pereira, Brazilian midfielder
 Marcel (singer), American country music singer
 Étienne Marcel (died 1358), provost of merchants of Paris
 Gabriel Marcel (1889–1973), French philosopher, Christian existentialist and playwright
 Jean Marcel (died 1980), Madagascan Anglican bishop
 Jean-Jacques Marcel (1931–2014), French football player
 Rosie Marcel (born 1977), English actor
 Sylvain Marcel (born 1974), Canadian actor
 Terry Marcel (born 1942), British film director
 Claude Marcel (1793-1876), French diplomat and applied linguist

Other uses
 Marcel (Friends), a fictional monkey in the television series
 Marcel (horse), a racehorse
 "Marcel" (song), a German entry for Eurovision 1963
 Marcel, Goa, a village in India
 "Marcel", a 2016 song by Her's
 Marcel, a novel by Erwin Mortier

See also
 Marcel wave, a hair styling technique
 Saint-Marcel (disambiguation)
 
 Marcell (disambiguation)
 Marsel, a given name
 Marvel (disambiguation)